The Kōsatsu (literally "High plaque"), also called Seisatu (literally "Controlling plaque"), was the public notice of the han-lord's or shogun's proclamations in the Japanese history. They were the local or nationwide laws written on the wooden plate, placed in the kōsatsu-ba of the shukuba or sekisho (関所), the border between han, where there was frequent traffic.

The kōsatsu has been used from the late Nara Period of the Japanese history. One of the kosatsu in the Edo Period was on prohibiting Christianity. 

As the people's literacy rate improved and the modern nation emerged, the kōsatsu was abolished in 1873 and eventually replaced by the Kanpō (Japanese government gazette) and other means.

See also
Public notice
Kanpo

References

External links

Legal history of Japan

History of communication

zh:高札場